GnosticPlayers is a computer hacking group, which is believed to have been formed in 2019 and gained notability in for hacking Zynga, Canva, and several other online services.

The Independent reported that the GnosticPlayers had claimed responsibility for hacking other online businesses, and stealing hundreds of millions of credentials from web databases such as MyFitnessPal, Dubsmash, and fourteen others; and subsequently selling these credentials on the dark web.

Reported members
In 2020 Night Lion Security listed these people as members of GnosticPlayers.

Maxime Tallet, who went under the aliases DDB, Casper, RawData, Pumpkin was the seller of the group.
Nassim Benhaddou who went under the aliases Prosox was a member of the group, and was known to be Gabriel's early associate.

In 2019, Nassim Benhaddou, Gabriel Kimiaie-Asadi Bildstein, as well as Maxime Tallet, were arrested after Gabriel self confessed they hacked Gatehub. The hack reportedly involved the theft of $9.5 million worth of cryptocurrency. However, Night Lion Security believes that Gnosticplayers weren't behind the hack.

Companies affected 
According to Night Lion Security, GnosticPlayers have breached the following companies:

500px • 8fit • 8tracks • Animoto • Armor Games • Artsy • Avito • BlankMediaGames • Bookmate • Bukalapak • Canva • Chegg • CoffeeMeetsBagel • Coinmama • Coubic • DailyBooth • DataCamp • DubSmash • Edmodo • Epic Games  • Evite • EyeEm • Fotolog • GameSalad • Gatehub • Ge.tt • GfyCat • HauteLook • Houzz • iCracked • Ixigo • Legendas.tv • LifeBear • Live Journal • LovePlanet • mefeedia • MindJolt • MyFitnessPal • MyHeritage • MyVestigage • Netlog & Twoo • OMGPop • Onebip • Overblog • Petflow • PiZap • PromoFarma • RoadTrippers • Roll20 • ShareThis • Shein • Singlesnet • Storenvy • StoryBird • StreetEasy • Stronghold Kingdoms • Taringa • Wanelo • WhitePages • Wirecard • Yanolja • Yatra • YouNow • Youthmanual • Zomato • Zynga

Night Lion Security says that GnosticPlayers have been involved in 25% of non-credit card related data breaches between January 1, 2017 and June 30, 2020.

See also
ShinyHunters
The Dark Overlord

References 

Hacker groups
Hacking in the 2020s

Hacking in the 2010s